Margaritifera auricularia is a species of European freshwater mussel, an aquatic bivalve mollusk in the family Margaritiferidae, the freshwater pearl mussels.  Formerly found throughout western and central Europe, the species is now critically endangered and is one of the rarest invertebrates worldwide, being confined to a few rivers in Spain and France. M. auricularia is commonly known as Spengler's freshwater mussel in honour of Lorenz Spengler, who first described this species.

Description 

Large shells are up to 180 mm in length.

Taxonomy 
There are different opinions on the taxonomy of this species.

The species was originally described as Unio auricularius Spengler, 1793.

When it is placed in the genus Margaritifera Schumacher, 1816, it is considered to be:
 Margaritifera auricularia (Spengler, 1793)

At other times it is placed in the genus Pseudunio F. Haas, 1910, in which case it is known as:
 Pseudunio auricularia (Spengler, 1793)

Sometimes it is given the masculine gender:
 Pseudunio auricularius auricularius (Spengler, 1793)

Distribution 
It is found in:
 France – recent distribution
 Italy – recent
 Spain – recent
 Portugal – recent(?) or fossil(?)
 maybe in some rivers in north Africa: Morocco
 Germany – locally extinct from upper Rhine after 1500
 Netherlands – extinct or fossil
 Belgium – extinct or fossil
 Luxembourg – extinct or fossil
 Czech Republic – only fossil records in layers with settlement from neolite: Ďáblice, Kobylisy, Roztoky, Podbaba.
 United Kingdom – ?

Ecology 
The fish hosts for the glochidium larvae of this species are: Salaria fluviatilis, Gambusia holbrooki, Acipenser baerii, Acipenser naccarii and Acipenser sturio.

The hosts for this species were unknown for a long time: as recently as 1998 they were still not known.

See also
Margaritifera laevis

References

External links

Further reading 

 Araujo, R & Moreno, R. 1999. Former Iberian Distribution of Margaritifera auricularia (Spengler) (Bivalvia: Margaritiferidae). Iberus, 17(1): 127–136.
 Araujo, R., Bragado, D. & Ramos, M. A. 2000. Occurrence of glochidia of the endangered Margaritifera auricularia (Spengler, 1793) and other mussel species (Bivalvia: Unionoida) in drift and on fishes in an ancient channel of the Ebro River, Spain. Archiv für Hydrobiologie, 148(1): 147–160.
 Araujo, R. & Ramos, M. A. 2000. A critic revision of the historical distribution of Margaritifera auricularia (Spengler, 1793) (Mollusca: Margaritiferidae) based on museum specimens. Journal of Conchology, 37(1): 49–59.
 Araujo, R. & Ramos, M. A. 2000. Status and conservation of the relict giant European freshwater pearl mussel Margaritifera auricularia (Spengler, 1793). Biological Conservation, 96(2): 233–239
  Grande, C., Araujo, R. & Ramos, M. A. 2001. The gonads of Margaritifera auricularia (Spengler, 1793) and Margaritifera margaritifera (L. 1758) (Bivalvia: Unionoidea). Journal of Molluscan Studies, 6: 27–35.

Araujo, R., Bragado, D. & Ramos, M. A. 2001. Identification of the river blenny, Salaria fluviatilis, as a host to the glochidia of Margaritifera auricularia. Journal of Molluscan Studies, 67: 128–129.

  Araujo, R., Cámara N. & Ramos, M. A. Glochidium metamorphosis in the endangered freshwater mussel Margaritifera auricularia (Spengler, 1793): A histological and scanning electron microscopy study. Journal of Morphology. 254: 259–265.
 Araujo, R., Quirós, M. & Ramos, M. A. 2003. Laboratory propagation and culturing of juveniles of the endangered freshwater mussel Margaritifera auricularia (Spengler, 1793). Journal of Conchology. 38(1): 53–60.
 Araujo, R. 2004 Two overlooked host fish species of Margaritifera auricularia (Bivalvia, Unionoidea, Margaritiferidae). Basteria, 67: 113.
 Vallejo, A., & Araujo, R. The Historical misidentification of Margaritifera auricularia for M. margaritifera (Bivalvia, Unionoidea) explained by their iconography. Malacologia. (in press)
 Araujo, R. & Ramos, M. A. 2001. Action Plan for Margaritifera auricularia. Convention on the Conservation of European Wildlife and Natural Habitats (Bern Convention). Council of Europe Publishing. Nature and environment, No. 117. Strasbourg. 28 pp.
 Araujo, R. & Ramos, M. A. 2001. Life-History data on the virtually unknown Margaritifera auricularia. En: Ecological Studies, Vol. 145. "Ecology and Evolution of the Freshwater Mussels Unionoida" ed. by G. Bauer and K. Wächtler. Springer-Verlag Berlin Heidelberg. 143–152. Por invitación.
 Araujo, R. & Ramos, M. A. 2001. Margaritifera auricularia. En: Los Invertebrados no Insectos de la "Directiva Hábitat" en España. Serie Técnica. Ed. Organismo Autónomo Parques Nacionales (Ministerio de Medio Ambiente). Madrid. 93–101.

auricularia
Molluscs of Europe
Bivalves described in 1793
Taxonomy articles created by Polbot
Taxobox binomials not recognized by IUCN